Club Baloncesto Gran Canaria – Claret, S.A.D.,  is a professional basketball club based in Las Palmas, Spain. The team plays in the Liga ACB. Their home arena is the Gran Canaria Arena. From 2012 until 2021, they have been sponsored by Herbalife.

History 
CB Gran Canaria was founded inside Claret School and for many years played under that denomination. Following a successful period in school competitions, a senior team was created and integrated on the Spanish Second Division. The team played in that division until 1984, when the team adopted the decision of having a statute of its own, therefore becoming an independent institution. The new statute was approved on May 22, 1985 and the team became Claret Club de Baloncesto.

The following years, the team moved many times between Liga ACB and 1st Division B. On the 1987–88 season the club changed its name to CB Gran Canaria, paying homage to the place where its social mass came from. On 30 June 1992 the team became a sports public limited company (Sociedad Anónima Deportiva, SAD in Spanish) in order to fulfil with the requirements of the then-new Spanish sports legislation.

After three seasons in the Spanish silver division the team won the first Liga EBA in the 1994–95 season and was promoted to Liga ACB. From that season on, CB Gran Canaria has stayed in the top level of the Spanish basketball. The 2012–13 represents the team's eighteenth consecutive season in Liga ACB.

In April 2015, Gran Canaria played the Eurocup Finals. The team was defeated by BC Khimki in the two legs. Ten months later, the club qualified for the first time to a final of a national trophy. In the 2016 Copa del Rey defeated Valencia Basket in the quarterfinals and Dominion Bilbao Basket in the semifinals, but could not beat Real Madrid in the final, where it lost by 81–85.

On 24 September 2016, Gran Canaria won its first national title after beating FC Barcelona 79–59 in the Final of the 2016 Supercopa played in Vitoria-Gasteiz.

One season later, in June 2018, Gran Canaria qualified for the second time to the league semifinals and also achieved qualification to the EuroLeague for the first time ever.

Sponsorship naming 

Through the years CB Gran Canaria has had several denominations due to its sponsorship:

Logos

Home arenas 
Centro Insular de Deportes: (until 2014)
Gran Canaria Arena: (2014–present)

Players

Retired numbers

Current roster

Depth chart

Head coaches 

Joaquín Costa: 1985–90
Manolo Hussein: 1990–92, 1995–2002
Trifón Poch: 1992–94
Roberto Orellana: 1994–95
Salva Maldonado: 2005–09, 2018
Pedro Martínez: 2002–05, 2009–2014, 2019
Aíto García Reneses: 2014–2016
Luis Casimiro: 2016–2018
Víctor García: 2018
Fotios Katsikaris: 2019–2020
Porfirio Fisac: 2020–2022
Jaka Lakovič: 2022–present

Season by season

Trophies and awards

Trophies 
 Supercopa de España: (1)
2016
 EuroCup Basketball:
Runners-up (1): 2015
 Copa del Rey:
Runners-up (1): 2016
2nd division championships: (2)
1ª División B: (1) 1991
Liga EBA: (1) 1995
Copa Toyota: (7)
2003, 2004, 2005, 2006, 2007, 2012, 2013
Trofeo Gobierno de Canarias: (4)
2006, 2007, 2008, 2010
Runners-up (4): 2002, 2005, 2009, 2011
 Rome, Italy Invitational Game: (1)
 2009

Individual awards 
All-ACB Team
Jaycee Carroll – 2011

Supercup MVP
Kyle Kuric – 2016

All-EuroCup First Team
Walter Tavares – 2015
Alen Omić – 2016

All-EuroCup Second Team
James Augustine – 2010
Kyle Kuric – 2015
Kevin Pangos – 2016

Notable players 

 Berdi Pérez
 Roberto Íñiguez
 Xavi Rabaseda
 Fran Vázquez
 Jorge Racca
 Brad Newley
 Carl English
 Walter Tavares
 Michael Bramos
 Joel Freeland
 Kornél Dávid
 Vincenzo Esposito
- Jim Moran
- Jay Larrañaga
- Pat Burke
 Gal Mekel
 Anžejs Pasečņiks
 Siim-Sander Vene
- Bo McCalebb
 Kirk Penney
- Sitapha Savané
 Willie 'Hutch' Jones
 Tom Scheffler
 Shaun Vandiver
 Albert Burditt
 John Morton
 Bernard Hopkins
 Kenny Miller
 Rex Walters
 Marcus Goree
- Ime Udoka
 Will McDonald
 Billy Keys
 Kennedy Winston
 Harper Williams
- Marcus Norris
- Jackson Vroman
- Nik Caner-Medley
 James Augustine
- CJ Wallace
- Jaycee Carroll

References

External links 
Official website
CB Gran Canaria at ACB.com 

 
Basketball teams in the Canary Islands
Basketball teams established in 1963
Liga ACB teams
Sport in Las Palmas